Sumit Nagal (born 16 August 1997) is an Indian professional tennis player. He won the 2015 Wimbledon boys' doubles title with his Vietnamese partner Lý Hoàng Nam, thus becoming the sixth Indian player to win a junior Grand Slam title. He is currently the highest-ranked Indian singles tennis player and since 2018, he has been a regular member of India's national Davis Cup squad.

Early life 

Sumit Nagal was born on 16 August 1997 to school teacher Suresh Nagal and his wife Krishna Devi, a homemaker in Jhajjar, Haryana. Nagal started playing tennis at the age of eight at a local sports club. When he was ten years old, he was selected to join Mahesh Bhupathi's training academy, as part of the first batch of Mahesh Bhupathi's Apollo Tyres Mission 2018 programme. As part of the programme, between 2008 and 2010, Nagal was based in Bangalore. Upon the programme closing down, Nagal shifted to Toronto for training with Coach Bobby Mahal.

Career

2015: Junior Wimbledon Title 
Nagal won his 1st ever ITF Futures title by defeating Gustavo Vellbach 6–2, 6–0 at India F8 tournament. Nagal then won India F11 by defeating compatriot Ronit Singh Bisht	6–3, 6–4. Nagal won the 2015 Wimbledon boys' doubles title with his Vietnamese partner Lý Hoàng Nam, defeating Reilly Opelka and Akira Santillan in the final. He became the sixth Indian player to win a junior Grand Slam title. Nagal won his 1st ever ITF futures doubles title with Vijay Sundar Prashanth by defeating compatriots Anirudh Chandrasekar and Vignesh Peranamallur 6–3, 7–5, he also won the singles in the same tournament by defeating  Vishnu Vardhan 7–6(7-5), 7–6(7-4).

2016: Davis cup debut 
Nagal won Uzbekistan F1 with Ti Chen by defeating Sanjar Fayziev and Jurabek Karimov	5–5 ret. He won Poland F6 by defeating Daniel Masur 6–4, 1–6, 6-3. Nagal made his Davis Cup debut for India in the 2016 World Group Playoff tie against Spain in New Delhi. He then won Hungary F7 by defeating Peter Nagy 7–6(7-3), 6-1.

2017: First ATP Challenger title 
Nagal ran into a controversy when he was dropped from Davis Cup team for serious disciplinary issues.

Nagal lost the final of Romania F2 to Gonçalo Oliveira 6–3, 3–6, 0-6. He then won Sri Lanka F1 by defeating Alexander Zhurbin 6–3, 6-2 and Sri Lanka F3 by defeating Carlos Bolunda-Purkiss 6–1, 6-1. He continued his good form by winning Italy F23 against Andrea Basso 6-4,6-4. Nagal then defeated Colin Van Beem by 6–3, 6-0 in the final of India F7.

Nagal won gold medal at Asian Indoor and Martial Arts Games by defeating compatriot Vijay Natrajan 6–1,6-1 in the final. He didn't drop a single set in the whole championship.

At Bengaluru Challenger Nagal stunned top seed Blaz Kavcic in the quarterfinals, then followed it by beating compatriot Yuki Bhambri in the semifinal and Jay Clarke in the Finals capturing his first challenger title.

2018: Asian Games Debut and Struggle with form
Nagal started the year at the Maharashtra Open where qualified for the main draw after beating compatriot Divij Sharan and Adrián Menéndez Maceiras but in the 1st round(of main draw) he lost to Ilya Ivashka 3-6,3-6. He lost his Davis Cup tie match to Zhang Ze 6-4,6-1. Nagal made his Asian Games debut in 2018 edition, He competed in doubles event pairing with Ramkumar Ramanathan, They reached the Quarter-finals before losing to eventual silver medallists Alexander Bublik and Denis Yevseyev. Nagal failed to win a single match in the qualifying rounds of any Grand Slam events, he missed US Open due to an injury. He lost to compatriot Ramkumar Ramanathan in the 1st round of 2018 Shenzhen Longhua Open after qualifying from qualifying draw. He then lost to Saketh Myneni in the Quarter-finals of 2018 Bengaluru Open 6-4,6-4. Nagal failed to reach final of any ITF or Challenger tournament at the end if the year.

2019: Debut at Grand Slam main draw 
2019 proved to be breakthrough year for Nagal. At the 2019 US Open, Nagal qualified to make his grand slam main draw debut. He faced Roger Federer in his opening round match. He lost the match but managed to take first set against the multiple grand slam champion.
Later he reached his second career ATP challenger final at the Banja Luka Challenger. He lost the championship match to Dutch player Tallon Griekspoor. The next tournament he reached the final again at Buenos Aires Challenger. He won the title defeating local player Facundo Bagnis. This was his second challenger title and his first on clay.

2020: First Grand Slam main draw win
At 2020 US Open, Nagal won his opening round match against Bradley Klahn, thus becoming first Indian since Somdev Devvarman at the 2013 US Open to win a singles match in the main draw of a Grand Slam. In second round he was defeated in straight sets by the second seed and eventual champion, Dominic Thiem.

2021: Olympic debut
Nagal started the year at the 2021 Australian Open where he received a wildcard entry into the main draw. He was defeated in straight sets to Ricardas Berankis 6-2,7-5,6-3. Nagal then qualified for main draw of Barcelona Open after beating Illya Marchenko and Thomas Fabbiano. But he was defeated in straight sets to Pierre-Hugues Herbert 5-7,0-6 in 1st round of main draw. He lost to Norbert Gombos in the qualifiers of BMW Open 4-6,7-6(7-2),1-6. He was seeded no.8 at the Prague Open, he defeated Zdeněk Kolář(6-2,6-4) and Sergiy Stakhovsky(4-6,6-1,6-4) but again lost to Norbert Gombos(4-6,2-6) who was the top seed.

Nagal qualified for the Tokyo Olympics in singles.
He reached the 2nd round after defeating Denis Istomin. He lost to Daniil Medvedev in the next round. Nagal holds the distinction of being the first Indian in 25 years to reach the second round of an Olympics singles tennis event. At 2021 US Open, Nagal was out in the qualifying round. Nagal had an early end to 2021 season due to a hip injury for which he underwent a surgery in November. But before he was injured he lastly played at Sibiu Challenger where he made it to the semi-finals before losing to top seed and eventual champion Stefano Travaglia 4-6,6-0,0-6.

2022: Struggles with Injuries and form

2023
Nagal began the season at Maharastra Open entering the main draw as wildcard. He lost to sixth seed Filip Krajinović in three sets in first round. He next lost to Shintaro Mochizuki in three sets in first qualifying round of the Nonthaburi Challenger. He then lost to Gauthier Onclin in three sets in first qualifying round of the 2023 BW Open ending the first month of the year winless.

Career statistics

Grand Slam tournament performance timeline

Current through the 2021 US Open.

ATP Challenger and ITF Futures finals

Singles: 13 (11–2)

Doubles: 2 (2–0)

Junior Grand Slam tournament finals

Boys' Doubles: 1 (1-0)

Controversies 
In 2017, after reports came to surface that Sumit had missed a practice session in July 2016 at Chandigarh during the tie against South Korea, citing elbow injury. He was dropped from the Indian Davis Cup squad led by Anand Amritraj which was scheduled to face the New Zealand between 3 and 5 February 2017. A source close to All India Tennis Association (AITA) told Sportskeeda, "It is a case of sheer indiscipline, on the part of the player. He missed several training sessions, brought his girlfriend to the camp without informing us. Several other discrepancies have also emerged, which led to the captain taking this call." Nagal denied the allegations, he got support from former India player Somdev Devvarman who stated that "I want to be clear once again. You have not chosen Sumit Nagal for the upcoming tie, because Sumit Nagal is NOT available to play. How do I know this? Because I have spent 2 weeks with Sumit in December helping him with his training and his rehab for the current shoulder injury he is recovering from."

References

External links
 
 
 

1997 births
Living people
Indian male tennis players
Tennis players at the 2020 Summer Olympics
Olympic tennis players of India
Tennis players at the 2018 Asian Games
Asian Games competitors for India
Grand Slam (tennis) champions in boys' doubles
Wimbledon junior champions
Indian expatriates in Canada
Indian expatriates in Germany
People from Jhajjar